SinaSoft Corporation is an Iranian software company founded in 1985.

SinaSoft has been inactive since early 2000s and most of the software development and support has been transferred to Sina Cultural and Software Foundation.

References

External links 
 SinaSoft website
 زرنگار و دیگر هیچ (Persian), an interview with leaders of Sina Cultural and Software Foundation.

Software companies of Iran
Software companies established in 1985
Business software companies
Iranian companies established in 1985